Twiggy (born 1949) is a British model, actress, and singer.

Twiggy may also refer to:

Arts and media

Music
 Twiggy (album)
 "Twiggy Twiggy", song by Japanese pop group Pizzicato Five

Other uses in arts and media
Twiggy (film) (original title "La Brindille"), a 2011 French drama film directed by Emmanuelle Millet
 Twiggy (Powerpuff Girls), a fictional pet hamster
 Twiggy the Water-Skiing Squirrel, an animal novelty act
 Twiggy, a fictional forest gnome rogue guest character in the D&D Web Series Critical Role
 Twiggy, a character in the British comedy series The Royle Family

People
 Roger Day, British broadcaster sometimes nicknamed "Twiggy"
 Andrew Forrest, nicknamed "Twiggy", an Australian mining magnate and one of the country's richest man
 James "Twiggy" Sanders, American basketball player
 Twiggy Stardom, Brittany Lahm's character in American girl group Huckapoo
 Jeordie White (born 1971), American musician formerly known as Twiggy Ramirez, now simply, Twiggy

Other uses
 OH 24 (aka "Twiggy"), a fossilized  Homo habilis skull discovered in 1968 
 Twiggy Apple FileWare, early floppy disk drives and diskettes designed by Apple